"Hangin' In" is a song written by Steve Bogard and Rick Giles, and recorded by American country music artist Tanya Tucker.  It was released in May 1994 as the third single from the album Soon.  The song reached #4 on the Billboard Hot Country Singles & Tracks chart.

Chart performance

Year-end charts

References

1994 singles
1993 songs
Tanya Tucker songs
Liberty Records singles
Songs written by Steve Bogard
Songs written by Rick Giles
Song recordings produced by Jerry Crutchfield